Pantelis Konomis (born 15 November 1996) is a former Cypriot footballer who played as a centre back. He could also play as a defensive midfielder.

Club career 
Konomis started his playing career from PAEEK FC academies. The summer of 2013 he transferred to Alki Larnaca to play for the first time in the Cypriot First Division. On 4 July 2014 he joined Omonia making the big step in his career.

References

External links 
 UEFA profile
 

1995 births
Sportspeople from Nicosia
Living people
Cypriot footballers
Alki Larnaca FC players
AC Omonia players
Association football central defenders